Yuliia Viktorivna Khrystiuk (born 7 April 2003) is a Ukrainian footballer who plays as a forward for American college team Old Dominion Lady Monarchs and the Ukraine women's national team.

Early life
Khrystiuk was raised in Vinnytsia.

College career
Khrystiuk has attended the Old Dominion University in the United States.

Club career
Khrystiuk has played for EMS-Podillia in Ukraine.

International career
Khrystiuk capped for Ukraine at senior level during the UEFA Women's Euro 2022 qualifying.

References

2003 births
Living people
Footballers from Vinnytsia
Ukrainian women's footballers
Women's association football forwards
Old Dominion Monarchs women's soccer players
Ukraine women's international footballers
Ukrainian expatriate women's footballers
Ukrainian expatriate sportspeople in the United States
Expatriate women's soccer players in the United States
Ukrainian women's futsal players